Kim Il-sung (15 April 1912 – 8 July 1994) was the leader of North Korea for 46 years, from its establishment in 1948 until his death in 1994.

According to North Korean sources, the works of Kim Il-sung amount to approximately 10,800 speeches, reports, books, treatises and other types of works. , about 60 of them are considered to be particularly important by outside observers.

Kim Il-sung's works are published and republished in countless collections. These include the 100-volume Complete Works of Kim Il-sung (chŏnjip(전집)), the 50-volume Collected Works (chŏjakchip(저작집)) and the 15-volume Selected Works (sŏnjip(선집)). In North Korea, his works are published by the Workers' Party of Korea Publishing House, but front organizations in Japan publish unofficial Korean-language editions as well. North Korean sources say that publishing houses in 110 countries have published works of Kim Il-sung in translations in some 60 languages.

The earliest work in the Enlarged Edition of Complete Collection of Kim Il Sung's Works is from October 1926. By the time of Kim's death, the collections had ballooned to unpractical sizes with even the Selected Works "too long and costly to be used in group study, the only kind the regime felt safe in encouraging" and the Collected Works "unfit to any propaganda purpose except to lead awed schoolchildren past". With more electricity and leisure time, too, such enormous collections were no longer popular.

All writings from before the time Kim returned to North Korea (19 September 1945) are considered to be unhistorical. There is no historical record of them from the purported time period and they only began to appear in the 1970s. It is evident from both their contents written to support later viewpoints in North Korean politics, and the style of writing characteristic to Kim in his later years, that they have been written much later, specifically in the late 1960s to early 1970s. For instance, On Organizing and Waging Armed Struggle Against Japanese Imperialism, dated to December 1931, discusses little-known labor strikes in Korea far away from Kim's whereabouts in Manchuria that a young and uneducated guerrilla wouldn't have likely known about due to Japanese censorship. Another particularly egregious example dated 1 June 1937, called Proclamation, stipulates that the Japanese are forcibly drafting Koreans to invade China and ultimately join WWII, when these did not take place until July 1937 and December 1941, respectively. They do, however, bear resemblance to his written style. This is also true of his later works, with only a handful of pieces that appear to have been ghostwritten for him. Suh Dae-sook attributes the lack of a ghostwriter to an identifiable writing style that has consistently matured and the fact that few of his subordinates have lasted in North Korean politics for such a long period of time without being subject to purges. Occasionally, Kim is given notes on technical subjects, but both the policies and texts are of his own making.

Many of the later writings, too have gone through edition in subsequent publications to match the political situation, typically by removing references to the roles of the Soviet Union and China in early North Korean politics, and by removing names of purged officials.

The English editions, published by the Foreign Languages Publishing House, as Kim Il-sung Works, Kim Il-sung Selected Works, and Kim Il-sung Complete Works have reached volume 50, eight, and seven, respectively. Volume seven of Selected Works was never published in English.

Kim was most prolific when writing about the North Korean economy, but his most impactful works tend to be on the management of the Workers' Party of Korea. He did not write as much on international relations, of the Korean reunification, save for "constant and perfunctory" references in his many speeches. The military of North Korea is also underrepresented in his writings, although many additional works pertaining to it might exist but be restricted. Kim's 1967 speech On the Immediate Tasks in the Direction of the Party's Propaganda Work in the aftermath of the Kapsan Faction Incident, is considered one of his most important ones, but remains likewise restricted.

According to the official North Korean version, Kim Il-sung laid out his Juche ideology in the 1955 speech On Eliminating Dogmatism and Formalism and Establishing Juche in Ideological Work. It is often considered a "watershed moment" in North Korean history. Half of the speech is, however, on matters unrelated to Juche and praises the Soviets, which is ill-suited to the ideology's stress on self-reliance. For the next ten years Kim failed to elaborate on Juche, even on important occasions such as his speech to mark the tenth anniversary of the North Korean state. The concept had all but completely disappeared from the vocabulary of his works with the exception of a 1960 speech, On the Lessons Drawn From Guidance to the Work of the Kangso County Party Committee, where he passingly mentions it. The next work to deal with Juche in detail was Kim's On Socialist Construction in the Democratic People's Republic of Korea and the South Korean Revolution, a lecture he had given when visiting Indonesia. The formulation of Juche as it is known today is from a 1972 interview with Mainichi Shimbun journalists, entitled On Some Problems of Our Party's Juche Idea and the Government of the Republic's Internal and External Policies. North Korea scholar B.R. Myers thinks that these occasions are too low-profile for introducing major ideological developments, leading him to conclude that the Juche idea is merely a front.

Different editions of collections have played a significant role in the propagation of Juche. In 1960, the second edition of a collection of Kim Il-sung's speeches was published. It included Kim's On Eliminating Dogmatism and Formalism and Establishing Juche in Ideological Work, which was not considered an important work at the time. After the publication, American scholars translated the speech into English and left the word "Juche" untranslated. According to Myers, this marked the begin of the recognition of Juche as a distinct ideology.

According to Myers, Kim Il-sung's cult of personality was consciously trying to match that of Mao Zedong. Thus when Mao was renowned for his poetry, the North Koreans matched this by claiming that Kim Il-sung had written plays during the anti-Japanese struggle of the 1930s. Two plays that were allegedly written by Kim Il-sung are The Sea of Blood and The Flower Girl. Nonetheless, Kim Il-sung also wrote poems, such as one called "Brightest Star", written in 1992 to congratulate Kim Jong-il on behalf of the latter's birthday. Kim Il-sung also wrote song lyrics. Official North Korean history also attributes operas to Kim. Sometimes Kim is attributed with writing the scripts of operas and plays directly, and at other times for providing the actual authors with the plots.

Kim delivered a New Year Address since 1 January 1946. Although the tradition was likely copied from the Soviet Union, North Korea made one important distinction. In the Soviet Union, the speech was always delivered by the formal head of state instead of Stalin who held real power. Since the North Korean state had not been organized by 1946, the task fell on Kim as the head of the North Korea Bureau of the Communist Party of Korea. The speech has been delivered by the supreme leader of North Korea instead of the formal head of state ever since, making it an important policy speech identified with the leader personally. 

With the Century, Kim Il-sung's eight-volume autobiography written shortly before his death, is his most popular work among North Korean readership.

Bibliography

Works

Collections

See also 

 Kim Jong-il bibliography
 Kim Jong-un bibliography
 Marxist bibliography

References

Works cited

Further reading

External links 

 Works by Kim Il-sung at Publications of the DPRK
 Books and articles  at Korean Friendship Association
 Audio excerpts at Voice of Korea
 Kim Il-sung at the Marxists Internet Archive
 Documents by Kim Il-sung at Wilson Center Digital Archive

 
Bibliographies by writer
Communist books